Pedro de la Vega (born 7 February 2001) is an Argentine professional footballer who plays as a winger for Lanús.

Club career
De la Vega started his career in the youth of Ferrocarril Sud before joining Lanús in 2015, having previously been rejected in trials with Boca Juniors and River Plate. Having been moved into the Argentine Primera División club's first-team squad for 2018–19, De la Vega was selected for his professional debut on 16 September 2018 during a home loss to Racing Club. He made two further appearances in September against Newell's Old Boys and River Plate respectively. He scored his first goal in the 2019 Copa de la Superliga, netting in a round of sixteen defeat to Vélez Sarsfield.

International career
In October 2018, De la Vega was selected to train with the Argentina U20s. In December, De la Vega was picked for the 2019 South American U-20 Championship. In the succeeding May, Fernando Batista called De la Vega up for the 2019 FIFA U-20 World Cup in Poland. He featured twelve times across the two tournaments.

Career statistics
.

Notes

References

External links

2001 births
Living people
Sportspeople from Buenos Aires Province
Argentine footballers
Argentina youth international footballers
Argentina under-20 international footballers
Association football forwards
Argentine Primera División players
Club Atlético Lanús footballers
Olympic footballers of Argentina
Footballers at the 2020 Summer Olympics